FK Slovan Levice is a Slovak football team, based in the town of Levice. The club was founded in 1911.

References

External links 

  

Football clubs in Slovakia
Association football clubs established in 1959